The Rovers Football Club was a former Mexican football team that played in the Liga Mexicana de Football Amateur Association prior to the professionalization and development of the Mexican first division.

History

The club was founded in 1912 by Percy Clifford and former members of the British Club. However, the team was disbanded in 1916 as a result of World War One since most of the players were British and returned to Europe to fight the war.

Honors

Liga Mexicana de Football Amateur Association

Runners-up (1): 1913–1914

Other

Tower Cup (2): 1912–13, 1915–16

References

See also
Football in Mexico
Reforma Athletic Club
Albinegros de Orizaba
Mexico Cricket Club
British Club

Defunct football clubs in Mexico City
Association football clubs established in 1912
1912 establishments in Mexico
1916 disestablishments in Mexico